Robert Aaron (born Robert Arron Vineberg; November 13, 1955) is a Canadian jazz musician. 
According to John Leland of the New York Times "Mr. Aaron played flute, saxophone, clarinet and piano, then taught himself guitar, trumpet, bassoon, French horn and other instruments." 
He performed for rapper Wyclef Jean's band from 1998 to 2008. 
Robin Caulden of Press-Republican said "He's played with everybody — Afrika Bambataa, B52s, Blondie, Chic, David Bowie, Heavy D, James Chance and The Contortions, RZA, Stetsasonic, William Vivanco and Wu-Tang Clan."

In 1981, he first started work with James Chance for the group James White and the Blacks; and has toured with him since in Europe and Japan.
He played sax on David Bowie's 1983 hit "Let's Dance". 
In 2010, Aaron released his album Trouble Man, which Michael Daly of the Daily Beast called "artistically adventurous but commercially unsuccessful".
Folk singer Eric Andersen, who used Aaron on several albums as a producer and performer, said "He is telepathic as a musician. He was completely dedicated and loyal to the job. Absolutely dedicated. He lived for his art. He personifies a cool that transcends the hot temperaments."

Early life
Aaron was born in Montreal in 1955. He was discouraged from pursuing music as a career by his father, who taught piano. However, as a teenager in the 1970s, he decided to move to New York to perform and record with his band.

Philip Seymour Hoffman Death
Aaron was arrested in February of 2014 for suspicion of selling the heroin that caused the overdose death of Philip Seymour Hoffman.   Ultimately, prosecutors dropped the most serious charge, which was intent to sell heroin.  He pleaded guilty to a lesser charge of felony drug possession, and was sentenced to five years’ probation.

Notable credits
Credits according to AllMusic:

References

External links
 

Living people
Canadian jazz saxophonists
Male saxophonists
Musicians from Montreal
1955 births
21st-century saxophonists
21st-century Canadian male musicians
Canadian male jazz musicians